Syntrophus aciditrophicus is a gram-negative and rod-shaped bacterium. It is non-motile, non-spore-forming and grows under strictly anaerobic conditions, thus an obligate anaerobe.  It degrades fatty acids and benzoate in syntrophic association with hydrogen-using microorganisms. Its genome was published in 2007.

References

External links 
 LPSN
 
Type strain of Syntrophus aciditrophicus at BacDive -  the Bacterial Diversity Metadatabase

Thermodesulfobacteriota
Bacteria described in 2001